"Conflict in Vietnam and at Home" was a speech given on March 18, 1968, by U.S. Senator Robert F. Kennedy at Kansas State University. Having only declared his candidacy for president two days before, the address was Kennedy's first official campaign speech. He discussed student protests, consequences of the Vietnam War, and Lyndon B. Johnson's leadership of the country.

Background
On March 16, 1968, Senator Robert F. Kennedy declared his candidacy for the Presidency. At 9:00 AM on March 18, Kennedy arrived at Kansas State University in Manhattan, Kansas, to give his first campaign speech. As a Landon Lecture, it had been scheduled long beforehand. In choosing Kansas State for his first appearance, Kennedy's campaign was hoping to attract a large number of student volunteers in a politically diverse region.

The speech
The 50 minute speech was written by Adam Walinsky. It was delivered in Ahearn Fieldhouse, where about 14,000 students had gathered.

Summary
Kennedy was anxious and unsure how the young crowd would receive him. He informally opened with a joke on the planned Vietnam Commission:

The crowd was surprised by this humor but received it well. Kennedy then began his written speech with a quote from Kansas native William Allen White:

This was also well received. He nervously continues on with his speech, stammering in a few places while his right leg shook. He gained more confidence as the audience became more enthusiastic. About ten minutes in, Kennedy began discussing President Lyndon B. Johnson's foreign policy and the Vietnam War:

The audience cheered. With his emotion increasing, Kennedy admitted his role in the escalation of the war:

Kennedy then approached the climax of his speech, raising his right fist into the air and speaking fervently: 

Kennedy looked up from his written text and improvised the final part of his speech: 

The crowd cheered wildly. Hundreds of students surrounded Kennedy as he attempted to leave, scratching his hands and pulling off his cuff links. Photographer Stanley Tretick, surprised by the hysteria, exclaimed, "This is Kansas, fucking Kansas! He's going all the fucking way!"

Aftermath
Kennedy continued on to Lawrence later that afternoon, where he would give another speech at the University of Kansas, incorporating many of the same elements in the first one. The speech is included in Kansas State University's Landon Lecture Series.

Kennedy's presidential campaign was ended abruptly two months later following his assassination.

Notes

External links
Full text of the speech (as written)
Full audio of the speech

References

Speeches by Robert F. Kennedy
Opposition to United States involvement in the Vietnam War
1968 in American politics
Kansas State University
1968 speeches